"The Pinocchio Theory" is a 1977 single by the American Funk band Bootsy's Rubber Band. It was released by Warner Bros. Records on February 9, 1977. The single first charted in Billboard magazine's Hot Soul Singles chart in March 1977 where it peaked at number six. "The Pinocchio Theory" inspired the George Clinton creation Sir Nose D'Voidoffunk (see P-Funk mythology: a lyric in the song says "you fake the funk, your nose got to grow", and Sir Nose fakes the funk). The B-side of "The Pinocchio Theory" is "Rubber Duckie".

Personnel

Bootsy Collins - lead vocals, bass, guitars, and drums
Bernie Worrell - keyboards
Joel Johnson - keyboards
Gary Cooper, Robert Johnson - vocals
Fred Wesley, Maceo Parker, Richard Griffith, Rick Gardner - horns

Songs about fictional male characters
Bootsy Collins songs
1977 singles
Songs written by Bootsy Collins
Songs written by George Clinton (funk musician)
1977 songs
Warner Records singles